Bamm-Bamm Rubble (sometimes spelled Bam-Bam Rubble) is a fictional character in the Flintstones franchise, the adopted son of Barney and Betty Rubble. He is most famous in his infant form on the animated series, but has also appeared at various other ages, including as a teenager on the early 1970s spin-off The Pebbles and Bamm-Bamm Show and as an adult in three television films. Cartoonist Gene Hazelton contributed to the original model sheets for the character, and he has said that he based Bamm-Bamm's design on his own son, Wes.

Biography
Bamm-Bamm is the adopted son of Betty and Barney Rubble after they found him left on their doorstep. After meeting his next-door neighbor Pebbles, he falls in love with her. Bamm-Bamm's "nickname" came from a note left in the basket, causing Barney and Betty confusion over the strange name. This was explained when Bamm-Bamm yelled the phrase "Bamm, Bamm!" and swung his club. Bamm-Bamm's excessive (and sometimes misused) strength was often a source of humor in the episodes in which the toddler version of Bamm-Bamm appeared. Unlike Pebbles, Bamm-Bamm was past the crawling stage and could be seen in a few episodes trying to help Pebbles walk.

As a teenager, Bamm-Bamm attended Bedrock High School along with Pebbles. In this version, Bamm-Bamm's super strength, while visible in the form of his muscular physique, was not actively mentioned and was only demonstrated on occasion. He became more passive and sensible in his manner and tended to be dominated by Pebbles's more aggressive personality. He was the owner of a "cave buggy", a prehistoric version of a dune buggy.

As an adult, Bamm-Bamm became a mechanic and married Pebbles. The two soon moved to Hollyrock (a fictionalized, prehistoric version of Hollywood) so Bamm-Bamm could pursue his true goal of becoming a screenwriter. Later, the couple had twins, Chip and Roxy.

Film

In the 1994 live-action Flintstones movie, Bamm-Bamm appears as a four-year-old who is adopted after Fred secretly gives money to Barney and Betty to ensure that they could afford the adoption. Bamm-Bamm is seen with long, matted, filthy-brown hair and only wearing a fig leaf loincloth. He was mentioned to have been raised by wild mastodons, a parody of various examples of interspecies adoption. This also hinted at how Bamm-Bamm had gained his incredible super-strength. Bamm-Bamm soon started to look like his cartoon counterpart after a bath, a haircut, and some new clothes. Bamm-Bamm was played by twins Hlynur Sigurðsson and Marinó Sigurðsson and voiced by actress E.G. Daily, who succeeded Don Messick in the role after his death.

Though Bamm-Bamm did not appear in the prequel film The Flintstones in Viva Rock Vegas, the name of the film's antagonist, Chip, is a reference to the name of Bamm-Bamm's son. Chip's mistress, Roxy, also gets her name from Bamm-Bamm and Pebbles's daughter.

Bamm-Bamm appears with his family in Space Jam: A New Legacy. He, his family, and the Flintstones are among the Warner Bros. 3000 Seververse inhabitants that watch the basketball game between the Tune Squad and the Goon Squad. When the inhabitants were seen making their way towards the sight of the game, Bamm-Bamm is seen getting picked up by Fred Flintstone.

Chronology
Through the various Flintstones incarnations, the age of Bamm-Bamm has varied wildly from spinoff to spinoff, appearing as an adolescent in one spinoff and as an infant again in the next. Arranged roughly in chronological order, the Flintstones incarnations in which Bamm-Bamm has made appearances are:

Infant or toddler
The Flintstones
The Man Called Flintstone
The New Fred and Barney Show
The Flintstones' New Neighbors
The Flintstones: Wind-Up Wilma
A Flintstones Christmas Carol
Cave Kids
The Flintstones & WWE: Stone Age SmackDown!
Space Jam: A New Legacy
Fruity Pebbles, Post commercials

Child or preteen
A Flintstone Christmas
The Flintstones: Little Big League
The Flintstones (live-action)
Yabba Dabba Dinosaurs

Teenager
The Pebbles and Bamm-Bamm Show 
Hanna-Barbera Educational Filmstrips featuring Bamm-Bamm: "Term Paper" and "Information Please"
The Flintstone Comedy Show
The Flintstone Funnies
The Rubbles

Adult
I Yabba-Dabba Do! 
Hollyrock-a-Bye Baby
A Flintstone Family Christmas
Bedrock

Casting
Bamm-Bamm's voice over the years was provided by Jay North, Don Messick, Lucille Bliss, Frank Welker, Christine Cavanaugh, Michael Sheehan, Elizabeth Daily, Jerry Houser, Dee Bradley Baker and Ely Henry. In Bedrock, Bamm-Bamm will be voiced by Manny Jacinto.

References 

The Flintstones characters
Fictional adoptees
Fictional baseball players
Fictional characters with superhuman strength
Fictional infants
Fictional mechanics
Fictional orphans
Fictional writers
Child characters in television
Post Foods characters
Television characters introduced in 1963
Animated human characters
Male characters in animation
Male characters in advertising
Child characters in animation
Child characters in advertising
Hanna-Barbera characters
Adoptee characters in television